Śródmieście ( meaning "city centre", "downtown") is the central borough (dzielnica) of the city of Gdynia. It borders the following districts: Oksywie, Obłuże, Pogórze (all three from the north), Chylonia, Leszczynki, Grabówek (all three from the west), Forest Plots and Kamienna Góra (from the south), and the Baltic Sea.

History 

Gdynia City Center was established mainly in the 1920s and 1930s. The modernist character of the center was created by such architects as Adam Kuncewicz and Roman Feliński.

Gdynia's downtown survived the war practically undamaged. During the Nazi occupation, the Germans changed the name of the district to Stadtmitte. 

In 1998, the Port district was incorporated into Śródmieście. Świętojańska is the oldest and most representative street in the city.

In 2015, the modernist layout of Gdynia City Center entered the list of historical monuments of Poland.

On September 26, 2019, the Modernist Center of Gdynia was placed on the UNESCO tentative list (as of 2020, Poland lists six properties on its tentative list). According to the nomination justification, the Modernist Center of Gdynia is unique as a heritage site of European town planning and architecture in which the ideals of Modernism have been confronted with the changing needs of a growing city and port. As of 2020, the UNESCO World Heritage List includes urban layouts of Tel Aviv, Le Havre, Brasilia, and Asmara.

Preservation and documentation 
At the end of 2021, as part of the KLIMATyczne Centrum project, the authorities of Gdynia announced the creation of new green areas, limiting car traffic and parking spaces, introducing one-way traffic on Świętojańska Street, and redevelopment of Władysława IV, Wójta Radtke, Jana z Kolna and 3 Maja Streets, several buffer car parks on the outskirts of Śródmieście, revitalization of 10 Lutego, Starowiejska and Abrahama Streets, changes to Kaszubski Square and Aleja Jana Pawła II.A historical importance of the city formed the basis of an exhibition called Gdynia – Tel Aviv and curated by Dr Artur Tanikowski. It coincided with the centennial of the founding of Gdynia and Bahaus School, 110th anniversary of Tel Aviv. The exhibition explored architectural and cultural links of two ‘white cities’ by the sea, opened at the Polin Museum of Jewish History in 2019 and traveled to the Gdynia City Museum.

Modernism in Europe – Modernism in Gdynia international conference takes place every year since 2007. Gdynia Modernism Trail is created and maintained by the Gdynia Development Agency.

Notable monuments 
There are several facilities and institutions in Śródmieście:

 Gdynia City Hall
 Gdynia District Court (Constitution Square 5)
 Gdynia Główna Railway Station (Constitution Square)
 City Market Halls (ul. Wójta Radtkego 36/40)
 Office building of the Social Insurance Institution (former PLO Building, ul. 10 Lutego 24, corner of ul. 3 Maja)
 BGK housing complex (ul. 3 Maja 27-31, corner of ul. 10 Lutego and corner of ul. Batorego)
 Port Construction Office (ul. Washingtona 38)
 Abraham's House (ul. Starowiejska 30)
 House of the Swedish Seaman (ul. Jana z Kolna 25)

Gdynia Seaport 

 Marine Station
 Emigration Museum
 Southern Pier
 Dar Pomorza
 ORP Błyskawica
 Gdynia Aquarium
 House of the Polish Sailor

Modernist townhouses 

 Pręczkowski Tenement House (Kościuszko Square 10-12)
 Peszkowski Tenement House (Kościuszko Square 14)
 Krenski House (ul. Świętojańska 55)
 Orłowski House (ul. Świętojańska 68)
 Hundsdorff House (ul. Starowiejska 7)

See also 

 Geddes Plan for Tel Aviv
 Architecture of Poland
 WUWA, modernist urban area in Wroclaw, Poland

References

External links
 

Modernist architecture in Poland
1930s in Poland
Modernist heritage districts
Gdynia
1920s in Poland